Kristján Jónsson (4 March 1852 – 2 July 1926) was minister for Iceland from 14 March 1911 to 24 July 1912. He was a member of Althingi 1893 to 1905 and from 1908 to 1913.

Biography
He was born on the farm Gautlönd in north east Iceland and two of his brothers became politicians, Pétur (28 August 1858 – 20 January 1922, member of Althingi 1894–1922, minister of Industrial Affairs 1920–1922) and Steingrímur (27 December 1867 – 29 December 1956, member of Althingi 1906–1915). Kristján was the father in law of Sigurður Eggerz, who later took office as Minister for Iceland. He is the great-grandfather of Icelandic footballer Jón Böðvarsson.

Death
Kristján died at his home in Reykjavík on 2 July 1926.

References 

1852 births
1926 deaths
Ministers for Iceland